George Hanks may refer to:

 George C. Hanks Jr. (born 1964), United States District Judge
 George H. Hanks (1829–1871), abolitionist and civil rights activist